The Bajo de la Carpa Formation is a geologic formation of the Neuquén Basin that crops out in northern Patagonia, in the provinces of Río Negro and Neuquén, Argentina. It is the oldest of two formations belonging to the Río Colorado Subgroup within the Neuquén Group. Formerly, that subgroup was treated as a formation, and the Bajo de la Carpa Formation was known as the Bajo de la Carpa Member.

At its base, this formation conformably overlies the Plottier Formation of the older Río Neuquén Subgroup, and it is in turn overlain by the Anacleto Formation, the youngest and uppermost formation of the Neuquén Group.

The Bajo de la Carpa Formation can reach  in thickness in some locations, and consists mainly of sandstones of various colors, all of fluvial origin, with thin layers of mudstone and siltstone in between. Geological features such as geodes, chemical nodules, impressions of raindrops, and paleosols (fossil soils) are commonly found in this formation as well.

Fossil content 

Vertebrate fossils are abundant within the Bajo de la Carpa Formation:
 a snake-necked turtle, Lomalatachelys
 a lizard, Paleochelco
 the snake Dinilysia
 diverse crocodylomorphs occupying a range of ecological niches: Comahuesuchus, Cynodontosuchus,  Lomasuchus, Gasparinisuchus, Neuquensuchus universitas, Notosuchus, Peirosaurus, Kinesuchus overoi, and Barrosasuchus neuquenianus
 titanosaurian sauropods including Bonitasaura, Overosaurus, Rinconsaurus, and Traukutitan
 the ceratosaurian theropods Llukalkan, Velocisaurus, and Viavenator exxoni
 the megaraptoran theropod Tratayenia rosalesi
 the bird-like theropods Achillesaurus and Alvarezsaurus
 the enantiornithine bird Neuquenornis
 the oldest known true flightless bird Patagopteryx
 the basal ornithopod Mahuidacursor
 an ankylosaur

Small nests with eggs inside, found in this formation, probably belonged to the bird Neuquenornis. Fossil wasp nests have also been found in these rocks.

See also 
 List of fossil sites
 List of dinosaur bearing rock formations
 Mata Amarilla Formation, contemporaneous formation of the Austral Basin

References

Bibliography

Further reading 
 

 
Geologic formations of Argentina
Cretaceous Argentina
Sandstone formations
Fluvial deposits
Geology of Patagonia